The 1994–95 season was FC Dinamo București's 46th season in Divizia A. Dinamo brought Ion Moldovan as head coach, but the team was 11th after the first half of the season. At the beginning of the second half, Moldovan was replaced by Remus Vlad, who started the second phase with five consecutive victories. The team finished the championship in the 3rd place.

After the final tournament of the world championship, FRF aligned with the world practice and decided to award 3 points for the victory, instead of 2 points as before. Also after the English fashion, FRF decided to set up a new trophy, the Romanian Super Cup, which was to be contested between the champion team and the winner of the Romanian Cup in the respective season.

Dinamo had a new record of debutants in this season: 16 – Vasile Brătianu, Gheorghe Ceaușilă, Razvan Chiriță, Mihai Drăguș, Cătălin Hîldan, Marian Ivan, Laurențiu Lică, Simion Mironaș, Dănuț Moisescu, Constantin Moldoveanu, Radu Niculescu, Florentin Petre, Cristian Savu, Ion Sburlea, Mihai Tararache, Constantin Varga.

Results

UEFA Cup 

First round

Trabzonspor won 5–4 on aggregate.

Squad 

Goalkeepers: Florin Prunea (17/0), Florin Tene (13/0).

Defenders: Gheorghe Mihali (23/1), Zoltan Kadar (22/0), Leontin Grozavu (15/0), Florin Constantinovici (14/0), Cornel Mirea (9/0), Ion Sburlea (7/0), Marian Pană (6/1), Constantin Varga (6/0),   Vasile Brătianu (4/0), Emanuel Moldoveanu (4/0), Simion Mironaş (2/0), Irinel Voicu (0/0).

Midfielders: Sebastian Moga (21/2), Costel Pană (13/1), Dănuţ Moisescu (12/1), Mihai Tararache (11/1), Dorin Mateuţ (9/4), Florentin Petre (7/1), Marius Cheregi (5/0), Cătălin Hîldan (3/0), Laurențiu Lică (3/0), Ionel Fulga (2/0), Torian Chiriţă (1/0), Marius Coporan (0/0), Eugen Popistașu (0/0).

Forwards: Marian Ivan (21/5), Viorel Moldovan (20/6), Sulejman Demollari (14/5), Gheorghe Ceaușilă (10/6), Cristian Pușcaș (9/1), Marian Savu (4/3), Radu Niculescu (3/0), Mihai Drăguş (0/0), Ionuţ Savu (0/0).

New Transfers 

Dinamo signed Dorin Mateuţ from Reggiana, Gheorghe Ceaușilă from PAOK FC, Marian Ivan from FC Brașov, Simion Mironaş from Gloria Bistrița and Radu Niculescu from FC Inter Sibiu.

In the winter break, Marius Cheregi was signed from Samsunspor, Constantin Varga from FC Politehnica Timișoara and Ion Sburlea from Universitatea Craiova.

References 
 RomanianSoccer.ro
 WorldFootball.net
 RSSSF.com
 labtof.ro

FC Dinamo București seasons
Romanian football clubs 1994–95 season